This is a list of Croatian television related events from 1993.

Events
28 February - Put are selected to represent Croatia at the 1993 Eurovision Song Contest with their song "Don't Ever Cry". They are selected to be the first Croatian Eurovision entry during Dora held at the Crystal Ballroom of Hotel Kvarner in Opatija.
15 May - Croatia enters the Eurovision Song Contest for the first time with "Don't Ever Cry" performed by Put.

Debuts

Television shows

Ending this year

Births

Deaths